Ursula Noctor (21 January 1965 – 4 April 1993) was an Irish long-distance runner, who was Irish national champion in the half marathon in 1992. She finished fourth at the 1991 and 1992 Chicago Marathons.

Career
Noctor was the course record holder for the Waterside Marathon. In 1982, she won the inaugural Cork Mini-Marathon. In 1987, Noctor came third at the 3,000 metres event at the Northern Irish Championships, competing as an athlete from the Republic of Ireland. In 1988, she won the 10,000 metres event at the Orlando Classic invitational meet. Noctor came third at the 1990 Columbus Marathon in a time of 2:39:26, winning $7,500.

Noctor finished fourth at the 1991 Chicago Marathon. In 1992, Noctor won the Republic of Ireland's National Half Marathon Championship. Later in the year, she finished fourth at the 1992 Chicago Marathon in a time of 2:41:52. It was her first marathon event since having surgery the year before.

Illness and death

In 1991, Noctor was diagnosed with melanoma, and she had to have some lymph glands removed. At the time, she was given a 10 per cent chance of survival. Noctor died on 4 April 1993 of complications caused by the melanoma. She was aged 28.

References

External links

1965 births
1993 deaths
Sportspeople from Dublin (city)
Irish female marathon runners
Irish female long-distance runners
Irish female middle-distance runners
Deaths from melanoma
Deaths from cancer in the Republic of Ireland